Cooperation Council may refer to:

 Arab Cooperation Council, an international economic organization
 Gulf Cooperation Council, a regional organization involving the six Persian Gulf Arab States
 Euro-Atlantic Partnership Council, a NATO organisation
 Pacific Economic Cooperation Council, a network of member committees composed of individuals and institutions